"Ricky's Hand" is a song by Fad Gadget, released as a single in 1980. It was the second Fad Gadget single, following "Back to Nature" the previous year. The track was not included on any studio album, predating a debut LP by several months, but does appear on several compilations. Mute Records founder Daniel Miller collaborated on the writing, playing and production.

Lyrically the song was a sardonic cautionary tale on the perils of drink driving: "From the pocket it pulled five pound / Ricky bought another round… Ricky contravened the highway code / The hand lies severed at the side of the road". The cover of the original vinyl single showed the hand in question being burnt by drops of beer in the fashion of a corrosive warning symbol.

The music was in a predominantly industrial style with an insistent electronic beat. A plaintive motif opened the track and recurred during the chorus, occasionally augmented by a distinctive 'choir girl effect', as it was described in the credits. An electric drill was also listed among the instruments; it can heard on the recording punctuating each mention of the song's title.

The B-side, "Handshake", was an instrumental that essentially mixed up the sounds used on the A-side. The blackly comical double meaning of its title was made evident by a cartoon strip on the single's rear sleeve depicting a blender being filled with milk, a man inserting his hand into the blender, and the device being switched on – with bloody results.

The single did not make the UK charts when released but was featured on some contemporary compilations such as Machines (1980). "Ricky's Hand" also appears on the CD compilations The Fad Gadget Singles (1992) and The Best of Fad Gadget (2001). Fad Gadget sang it on the Belgian RTBF show Cargo De Nuit in 1980 with his two live musicians at the time, Phil Wauquaire  and Jean-Marc Lederman.

Track listing
"Ricky's Hand" – 4:06
"Handshake" – 4:47

Personnel
 Fad Gadget – synthesizer, vocals, tapes, Black & Decker V8 double speed electric drill
 Daniel Miller – synthesizer
 B.J. Frost – choir girl effect

References

 George Gimarc (2005). Punk Diary: 1970-1982 

1980 singles
1980 songs
Mute Records singles
British new wave songs